The following is a partial list of the "A" codes for Medical Subject Headings (MeSH), as defined by the United States National Library of Medicine (NLM).

This list continues the information at List of MeSH codes (A08). Codes following these are found at List of MeSH codes (A10). For other MeSH codes, see List of MeSH codes.

The source for this content is the set of 2006 MeSH Trees from the NLM.

– sense organs

– ear

– ear, external
  – ear canal
  – ear cartilages
  – tympanic membrane

– ear, middle
  – ear ossicles
  – incus
  – malleus
  – stapes
  – eustachian tube
  – glomus tympanicum
  – stapedius
  – tensor tympani

– ear, inner
  – cochlea
  – basilar membrane
  – cochlear aqueduct
  – cochlear duct
  – stria vascularis
  – tectorial membrane
  – organ of corti
  – hair cells
  – hair cells, inner
  – hair cells, outer
  – labyrinth supporting cells
  – round window
  – scala tympani
  – spiral ganglion
  – spiral lamina
  – semicircular canals
  – hair cells, vestibular
  – vestibule of the ear
  – oval window
  – saccule and utricle
  – acoustic maculae
  – hair cells, vestibular
  – otolithic membrane
  – vestibular aqueduct
  – endolymphatic duct
  – endolymphatic sac

– eye

– anterior eye segment
  – anterior chamber
  – aqueous humor
  – endothelium, corneal
  – cornea
  – bowman membrane
  – corneal stroma
  – descemet membrane
  – endothelium, corneal
  – epithelium, corneal
  – limbus corneae
  – trabecular meshwork

– conjunctiva

– eyelids
  – eyelashes
  – meibomian glands

– lacrimal apparatus
  – nasolacrimal duct

– lens, crystalline
  – lens capsule, crystalline
  – lens cortex, crystalline
  – lens nucleus, crystalline

– oculomotor muscles

– pigment epithelium of eye

– retina
  – amacrine cells
  – blood-retinal barrier
  – fundus oculi
  – macula lutea
  – fovea centralis
  – optic disk
  – photoreceptors
  – photoreceptors, invertebrate
  – photoreceptors, vertebrate
  – rods
  – cones
  – rod outer segments
  – retinal bipolar cells
  – retinal ganglion cells
  – retinal horizontal cells

– sclera

– uvea
  – blood-aqueous barrier
  – choroid
  – bruch membrane
  – ciliary body
  – iris
  – pupil

– vitreous body

– nose

– olfactory mucosa
  – olfactory receptor neurons

– vomeronasal organ

– taste buds

The list continues at List of MeSH codes (A10).

A09